The Automation Institute is an Argentine Research Institution located in San Juan Province (Argentina) dedicated to research advanced topics of Control Engineering, Robotics and Electronics.

History 
The INAUT was created in 1973 under the umbrella of the National University of San Juan.  It is one of the 14 Research Institutes that operate under the hood of this academic institution.

Research Area 

The scope of the Institute is, broadly, research and development of Automatic Control.  Nowadays, the following research programs are being conducted: Robotics, Manufacture, Process Control, Control Artificial Intelligence, Industrial Electronics, Sensors.  International Cooperation is encouraged and many projects are being executed jointly with similar International Research Centers.  One important goal of the institute is to successfully achieve a technology transfer to the public and private industry sector.

The INAUT is located in Av. San Martin -Oeste- 1112, San Juan, Argentina.  It includes laboratories, libraries, conference rooms, workshops and administrative offices.

Personnel includes professional researchers, scholars, and technical staff and sum up to 27 persons.
The Institute is now committed to develop very specialized human resources and to foster the area in the country.

Financial Sources
 National University of San Juan
 National Science and Technology Secretary (SECYT) and National Agency for Science and Technology Promotion (ANPCyT ANPCyT)
 National Research Council (CONICET)
 Technology transfer funds
 International Agencies (ICI, CYTED, DAAD, EU, INCO, ALFA, CAPES)

See also
 Universidad Nacional de San Juan

External links
 Official website of the INstituto de AUTomatica

Research institutes in Argentina
Robotics organizations
1973 establishments in Argentina